The Government of the Ethiopian Empire   was historically based on the framework of absolute monarchy with feudal system, where religious legitimacy and wealthier class generally proned priority. Societies were characterized by social inequality and opportunities for social mobility through performance of military performance.  There is series of famines, droughts and illegitimate land acquisition from peasants and landowners.

Under Emperor Menelik II, Ethiopia became centralized state under multiethnic empire with over 80 ethnic groups despite having Shewan Amhara dominance. Ethiopia then modernized by Emperor Haile Selassie after his coronation in 1930, bringing two constitution in 1931 and the revisited in 1955 that was unitary parliamentary system with legislature divided into Chamber of Senate and Chamber of Deputies.

1270–1931
Historically, ethnic Tigrayans and Amhara situated in northern Ethiopian plateau used authoritarian fashion, their rulers infused religious legitimacy (the Orthodox Church) and their wealth derived from agricultural production. The societies were hierarchically stratified, featuring both social inequality and opportunities for social mobility through successful military performance. Land always has been the most valuable resource and acquisition became the main driving force behind imperialism especially from the reign of Menelik II.

Feudalism was a predominant sociopolitical and economic order of Ethiopia for many years. In this system, society was classified in accordance with wealth, especially land acquisition, where landlords own large amount of land. In modern sense, the landlords were capitalist farmers and landless class was growing. Famines may be surged in this process. Under Menelik's Expansions (1878–1904), Ethiopia became multiethnic empire characterized by shared states. Within a delimited boundary, Menelik then formed a more centralized government by the 1900s.

Amharic became the central language of the Empire until the 20th century reforms of Haile Selassie. Shewan Amhara dominance starting from 19th century has viewed by other largest ethnic groups like Tigrayans and Oromos oppressive characterized by mass forced land acquisition. The emperor also had ultimate rights of directing and creating professional army and salaried army. Traditionally, the Ethiopian soldiers who, in times of war, were provided by regional lords. These soldiers were not paid, but had to live what they could acquire from the local population during military campaigns. He further pushed to centralized command government and initiating paying a salary to the soldiers.

In few years after coronation in 1930, Emperor Haile Selassie took an initiative that replace traditional, decentralized governance and began modernizing the country.

1931–1974
Since 1931, Ethiopia had the first constitution, its own legislature and judiciary and an independent police force promulgated under Emperor Haile Selassie. The constitution instituted Chamber of the Senate and Chamber of Deputies, whose laws can be executed by imperial promulgation. The emperor had right to decide what forces, treaties and confer title to princes and other dignitaries.

The revisited 1955 constitution was promulgated on 4 November 1955, comprising 131 Article. This constitution was important to reduce regional warlords and consolidate the imperial power. The two constitution vested power to the Chamber of Senate (Yeheggue Mewossegna Meker Beth) and Chamber of Deputies (Yeheggue Memeriya Meker Beth). Under the 1956 constitution Article 56, no one can be simultaneously a member of Chamber Deputies or Senate, marking their meeting at the beginning or ending of each session.

In the parliamentary structure, the Chamber of Deputies consisted of 250 members elected in four years, whereas the Senate comprised one-half of Deputies 125 members appointed by the Emperor in every 6 years.

References

Ethiopian Empire
Government of Ethiopia